West Nottingham is an unincorporated community in the town of Nottingham in Rockingham County, New Hampshire, United States.

West Nottingham has a separate ZIP code (03291) from the rest of Nottingham.

Notable people
Homer Bigart, Pulitzer Prize winning war correspondent.
 Else Holmelund Minarik (1920–2012), author of children's books

References

Unincorporated communities in Rockingham County, New Hampshire
Unincorporated communities in New Hampshire
Nottingham, New Hampshire